Okinawa City Gymnasium is an arena in Okinawa, Okinawa, Japan. It is the home arena of the Ryukyu Golden Kings of the B.League, Japan's professional basketball league.

Gallery

References

Okinawa, Okinawa
Basketball venues in Japan
Indoor arenas in Japan
Ryukyu Golden Kings
Sports venues in Okinawa Prefecture
Sports venues completed in 2010
2010 establishments in Japan